Gurab-e Sofla (also Romanized as Gūrāb-e Soflá; also known as Gūrāb-e Pā’īn) is a village in Lumar Rural District, Central District, Sirvan County, Ilam Province, Iran. At the 2006 census, its population was 213, in 44 families. The village is populated by Kurds.

References 

Populated places in Sirvan County
Kurdish settlements in Ilam Province